The Golden Lotus Award for Best Picture is one of the Golden Lotus Awards presented annually since the awards debuted in 2009, by the Macau Film and Television Media Association and China International Cultural Communication Center.

Award winners and nominees

2000s

2009 (1st)

2010s

2010 (2nd)

2011 (3rd)

2012 (4th)

2013 (5th)

2014 (6th)

2015 (7th)

2016 (8th)

2017 (9th)

References

External links

Golden Lotus Awards
Awards established in 2009
2009 establishments in Macau
Awards for best film